Pietraperzia (Sicilian: Petrapirzia) is a comune in the province of Enna, in Sicilian region of southern Italy.

Notable people 
Elvira Mancuso, 20th century writer who was born in and died in Petrapirzia
Vincenzo Aurelio Guarnaccia (born Pietraperzia, 1899 - died Milan, 1954) was an Italian poet and translator.

References

Municipalities of the Province of Enna